Tapani Niku (born Karsikas, 1 April 1895 – 6 April 1989) was a Finnish cross-country skier who competed at the 1924 Winter Olympics. He won a bronze medal in the 18 km event and failed to finish his 50 km event. At the FIS Nordic World Ski Championships 1926 he placed sixth over 50 km and 13th over 18 km.

Niku won nine national titles, in the 10 km (1923–26), 30 km (1921, 1923 and 1925–26) and 60 km events (1925). He also won the 50 km race at the Lahti Ski Games in 1923–25. He retired in 1926 and later worked as a forester and a ski manufacturer.

After he had died, he was honoured with a state funeral.

Cross-country skiing results
All results are sourced from the International Ski Federation (FIS).

Olympic Games
 1 medal – (1 bronze)

World Championships

References

External links
 

1895 births
1989 deaths
People from Haapavesi
Finnish male cross-country skiers
Olympic cross-country skiers of Finland
Cross-country skiers at the 1924 Winter Olympics
Olympic bronze medalists for Finland
Olympic medalists in cross-country skiing
Medalists at the 1924 Winter Olympics
Sportspeople from North Ostrobothnia
20th-century Finnish people